Jeonghyegyeolsa (“Correct Wisdom Society”) was a Buddhism movement.  It was dedicated to the pursuing of Samadhi. It was moved by Jinul who established a new tradition of the Korean Buddhism.

References

Buddhist meditation